Tsarevo is a rural locality (a village) in Yaganovskoye Rural Settlement, Cherepovetsky District, Vologda Oblast, Russia. The population was 22 as of 2002.

Geography 
Tsarevo is located 27 km northeast of Cherepovets (the district's administrative centre) by road. Lokhta is the nearest rural locality.

References 

Rural localities in Cherepovetsky District